Julio Enrique Sibrián Molina (born 17 July 1995) is a Salvadoran professional footballer who plays as a centre-back for Primera División club Águila and the El Salvador national team.

International career
Sibrián debuted for the El Salvador national team in a 2–0 2022 FIFA World Cup qualification win over Grenada on 25 March 2021. He was an emergency callup to El Salvador for the 2021 CONCACAF Gold Cup after Rómulo Villalobos had to withdraw due to injury.

References

External links
 
 

1996 births
Living people
People from La Libertad Department (El Salvador)
Salvadoran footballers
El Salvador international footballers
El Salvador youth international footballers
Association football defenders
C.D. Sonsonate footballers
C.D. FAS footballers
Salvadoran Primera División players
2021 CONCACAF Gold Cup players